The Hot Digital Tracks chart is a song popularity chart that ranks the best selling digital tracks in the United States according to Billboard magazine.  It is not to be confused with the Hot Digital Songs chart, which combines different versions of songs for a summarized figure (for example remixes, "explicit" or "clean" versions,  and/or any other alternate versions can chart separately here, whereas all versions of the same track occupy only one position on Hot Digital Songs).

Soundscan started tracking download at the end of June 2003 and the first download chart was created in July 2003.  However, the data from Hot Digital Songs would not be used as a component for compiling the Billboard Hot 100 until January 2005. Digital songs with UPC counts towards Hot 100 but those without does not.

References

External links
 Current Billboard Hot Digital Tracks chart

Billboard charts